The 2016 Samoa vs. Fiji rugby league test match was played between Samoa and Fiji at Apia Park.

Background
On 7 May 2016, it was confirmed that Apia would host a test-match between Samoa and Fiji on 8 October 2016, marking the 30th anniversary of rugby league in Samoa. John Grant, the Chief Executive of the Australian Rugby League Commission, shared his support for the test by confirming that an Australian registered referee would be provided along with senior staff and management to help with the organisation of the match.

Squads
Samoa picked 6 débutantes for the test match, while Fiji selected four. All of the Samoan team had players based in the NRL except for Denny Solomona, who plays for Super League club Castleford Tigers. Fiji on the other hand had a fair share of National Rugby League, and New South Wales Cup players along with one domestic player, Pio Seci. Samoa's most capped player was Leeson Ah Mau, who made his 11th appearance for his country, while Fiji's most experienced player was James Storer, who also made his 11th appearance for his country.

St. George Illawarra's Leeson Ah Mau captained Samoa, and Wests Tigers' Kevin Naiqama led Fiji.

Match summary

Fiji won the match after trailing 18-0 at the 20 minute mark. Samoa were dominating proceedings in the opening quarter as they controlled most of the possession and territory but Fiji hit back in the back-end of the game with Samoa's errors ruining the home team's chances.

See also

Pacific Rugby League International

References

2016 in rugby league
Sport in Apia
Rugby league in Samoa